The 2022 Laurie O'Reilly Cup was the 13th edition of the competition. The matches were played on 20 and 27 of August, with both Australia and New Zealand hosting one match each.

After a two year absence due to the COVID-19 pandemic, it was confirmed that the competition would return. The first test was played in Christchurch at the Orangetheory Stadium on 20 August 2022. The second test was played in a curtain raiser to the Wallabies and Springboks test in Adelaide on 27 August 2022.

The Black Ferns won the first test in Christchurch with an overwhelming 52–5 score and retained the O'Reilly Cup. They won the series after winning the second test in a hard-fought match, the game ended 14–22.

Table

Fixtures

First match

Notes:
Awhina Tangen-Wainohu and Tyla Nathan-Wong of the Black Ferns, and Bree-Anna Cheatham (Australia) made their international debuts.
Charmaine McMenamin (New Zealand) returns for her first test match since 2019.
New Zealand win their 21st test match against the Wallaroos.
New Zealand and Australia haven’t played for the O’Reilly Cup since 2019.

Second match

Notes:
This will be the 22nd Test between New Zealand and Australia, the Black Ferns have won every Test between the nations.
Ariana Bayler (New Zealand) gets her first start at Scrum-half, her previous four Tests were off the bench.
Grace Steinmetz made her test debut, while Santo Taumata made her international debut for the Black Ferns.
Siokapesi Palu and Bienne Terita made their international debuts for the Wallaroos.

Squads

Australia 
On 2 August, head coach Jay Tregonning named a 32-player squad for the 2022 Laurie O'Reilly Cup.

Head coach:  Jay Tregonning

New Zealand 
On 2 August, head coach Wayne Smith named a 33-player squad for the 2022 Laurie O'Reilly Cup.

Head coach:  Wayne Smith

Broadcast 
All the O’Reilly Cup matches were broadcast live on Sky.

References 

Laurie O'Reilly Cup
Australia women's national rugby union team
New Zealand women's national rugby union team
Laurie O'Reilly Cup
Laurie O'Reilly Cup